Hiroki Ueno (上野 大樹, born October 13, 1986) is a Japanese former professional baseball pitcher. He played for the Chiba Lotte Marines in Japan's Nippon Professional Baseball from 2009 to 2015.

External links

NPB

1986 births
Living people
People from Adachi, Tokyo
Toyo University alumni
Japanese baseball players
Nippon Professional Baseball pitchers
Chiba Lotte Marines players